The Great Lakes Bantu languages, also known as Lacustrine Bantu and Bantu zone J, are a group of Bantu languages of East Africa. They were recognized as a group by the Tervuren team, who posited them as an additional zone (zone J) to Guthrie's largely geographic classification of Bantu.

History
By 500BC, proto-Great Lakes Bantu speakers initially settled between Lakes Kivu and Rweru in Rwanda, before rapidly spreading as far east as Kenya.

Languages
The languages are, according to Bastin, Coupez, & Mann (1999), with Sumbwa added per Nurse (2003):

Gungu (E10)
Bwari (Kabwari) (D50)
Konzo (D40): Konjo, Nande, ? Kobo
Shi–Havu (D50): Hunde, Havu, Shi, Tembo, Nyindu, Fuliiro
Rwanda-Rundi (D60): Kinyarwanda, Kirundi, Shubi, Hangaza, Ha, Vinza
Nyoro–Ganda (E10): Ganda, Nyankore, Nyoro, Tooro, Hema, Chiga, Soga, Gwere, West Nyala, Ruli
(See also Rutara languages, Runyakitara language, Nkore-Kiga)
Haya–Jita (E20): Haya–Rashi, Talinga-Bwisi, Zinza, Kerebe (Kerewe), Jita–Kara–Kwaya–Ruri, Nyambo, Subi
Masaba–Luhya (E30): Masaba (incl. Bukusu), Luhya proper, Nyore (or Nyole in Kenya), Nyole (or Olunyole in Uganda), Samia–Songa, Marachi, Khayo
Logooli–Kuria (E40): Logooli (Luhya), Ngurimi, Ikizu–Sizaki/Shashi, Suba, Suba-Simbiti, Kabwa, Singa, Idaxo-Isuxa-Tiriki (Luhya), Gusii (Kisii), Kuria (Simbiti, Hacha, Surwa, Sweta), Zanaki, Ikoma, ?Ware
Sumbwa (F20)
The codes in parentheses are Guthrie's original geographic classification.

Maho (2009) adds Yaka. Kobo was recognized later. It's said to be about equidistant between Nande and Hunde, so it's not clear where it should be in the tree above.

Glottolog (2022) separates Nyole in Uganda (and its dialects: Hadyo or Luhadyo, Menya, Sabi or Lusabi, and Wesa or Luwesa) from the E30 group (Masaba-Luhya) into an unclassified subgroup within a "Greater Luyia" group containing the Logoo-Kuria (E40) group. Beside this, it does not consider this older geographic classification relevant for its ongoing classification based on more recent linguistic studies, and uses four different subgroups (Greater Luhya, West Nyanza, East Nyanza, and Western Lakes Bantu), keeping Gungu (E10) separate from them.

Notes